Jose Luis Merino (10 June 1927 – 2 July 2019) was a Spanish film writer and director who developed a cult following among horror film fans.

Biography
He was born in 1927 in Madrid, Spain, as José Luis Merino Boves, and went on to direct around 30 films during his long and varied career as director and writer (1958–1990), most of them action/adventure films, crime dramas, spaghetti westerns, war movies and costume dramas involving Robin Hood, pirates, Zorro etc. He is known to horror film fans for the two horror movies he directed in the early 1970s: Orgy of the Dead ( The Hanging Woman) and Scream of the Demon Lover (a.k.a. Ivanna), which have both become cult classics over the years. Merino never considered himself a horror film director, he chose rather to favor his many action/adventure films. He died on July 2, 2019, at age 92.

Films

Director
1958: Aquellos tiempos del cuplé
1960: El vagabundo y la estrella
1964: Alféreces provisionales
1966: Por un puñado de canciones
1967: Frontera al sur (as Joseph Marvin)
1968: Réquiem para el gringo
1968: Colpo sensazionale al servizio del Sifar
1969: La batalla del último Panzer
1969: Comando al infierno
1970: Las cinco advertencias de Satanás
1970: Robin Hood, el arquero invencible
1970: More Dollars for the MacGregors 
1970: Scream of the Demon Lover (a.k.a. Ivanna)
1970: Consigna: matar al comandante en jefe
1970: El tigre del Kyber
1970: La última aventura del Zorro
1971: El Zorro caballero de la justicia
1971: El Zorro de Monterrey
1972: La rebelión de los bucaneros (a.k.a. Pirates of Blood Island)
1973: The Hanging Woman (a.k.a. La orgía de los muertos)
1974: Juegos de sociedad
1974: Tarzán en las minas del rey Salomón (as J.L. Merino Boves)
1974: Juan Ciudad: ese desconocido (Documentary short)
1976: Sábado, chica, motel ¡qué lío aquel!
1977: Marcada por los hombres
1979: 7 cabalgan hacia la muerte
1982: Dejadme vivir (Short)
1983: USA, violación y venganza
1983: La avispita Ruinasa
1984: Gritos de ansiedad
1990: Superagentes en Mallorca

Writer
1958: Aquellos tiempos del cuplé
1960: El vagabundo y la estrella
1964: Alféreces provisionales
1966: Por un puñado de canciones
1967: Frontera al sur
1968: La ametralladora
1969: La batalla del último Panzer
1969: Hora cero: Operación Rommel
1969: Comando al infierno
1970: Las cinco advertencias de Satanás
1970: Robin Hood, el arquero invencible
1970: La muerte busca un hombre
1970: Scream of the Demon Lover (a.k.a. Ivanna)
1970: Consigna: matar al comandante en jefe
1970: El tigre del Kyber
1971: El Zorro caballero de la justicia
1971: Como un ídolo de arena
1971: El Zorro de Monterrey
1972: La rebelión de los bucaneros
1973: La orgía de los muertos
1974: Tarzán en las minas del rey Salomón
1974: Juan Ciudad: ese desconocido (Documentary short)
1975: En la cresta de la ola
1976: Sábado, chica, motel ¡qué lío aquel!
1977: Marcada por los hombres
1979: 7 cabalgan hacia la muerte
1982: Dejadme vivir (Short)
1983: USA, violación y venganza
1983: La avispita Ruinasa
1984: Gritos de ansiedad
1990: Superagentes en Mallorca

Actor
1979: Las verdes praderas
1979: 7 cabalgan hacia la muerte - Zachary
1980: Viva la clase media - Camarero
1981: El crack - Meri
1983: El crack dos - Meri
1997: La herida luminosa
1998: The Grandfather - Camarero casino
2000: You're the One - Aldeano 1
2004: Tiovivo c. 1950 - (final film role)

References

External links

1927 births
2019 deaths
Horror film directors
Spaghetti Western directors
Film directors from Madrid